Cinemeccanica is a motion picture equipment company specializing in cinema projectors. The company was formed in 1920 in Milan, Italy. Currently they have two film projectors available, the Victoria 5 (introduced in 1975) and the Victoria 8 (introduced in 1961). A new digital projector, the CMC3 D2 is also available.

The Victoria 8 at one time came in two models, a 35 mm film gauge and a dual 35/70 mm film gauge. The projector has become less popular in recent years with the smaller and cheaper Victoria 5 now the best selling projector from Cinemeccanica.

The company also manufacture film platter systems (the CNR-35N), film rewinders and Dolby Digital and SR soundtrack readers.

See also

List of Italian Companies

External links

Cinemeccanica
Pico Projector Comparison
Answers Article About Cinemeccanica
Youtube video of a Victoria 5 Projector

Electronics companies of Italy
Manufacturing companies based in Milan
Manufacturing companies established in 1920
1920 establishments in Italy
Italian brands
Projectors